The Russian Individual Speedway Championship is a Motorcycle speedway championship held each year to determine the Russian national champion. Mikhail Starostin holds the record for the most titles with seven. The Soviet Union Individual Speedway Championship was staged injunction with the Russian Individual Speedway Championship from 1959 to its dissolution in 1992.

Russian Championship 1960–present

Soviet Union Championship 1959–1992

See also
 Sport in Russia

References

Russia
Motorsport competitions in Russia
Speedway in Russia
National championships in Russia